Florence Margaret Spencer Palmer (July 27, 1900 – March 29, 1987) was a British composer who wrote several hymns and a piano pedagogy textbook. She published some of her works under the name Peggy Spencer Palmer.

Spencer Palmer was the youngest of seven children born in Thornbury, Gloucestershire, to James and Amy Spencer Palmer. She was taught at home until age 10, when she attended school for five years. She then studied at the Royal Academy of Music, and earned a Bachelor of Music degree from the University of London. Her teachers included Sir Ivor Atkins, Benjamin Dale, Vivian Longrish, Mabel G. Smith, and Norman Sprankling.

Spencer Palmer worked as an accompanist and secretary to Mrs. Catherine Booth-Clibborn (Kate Booth), the daughter of Salvation Army founder William Booth. She later taught music at the following schools:
1929–1947: Clarendon School, Malvern, Worcestershire
1948–1958: Redlands High School, Bristol
1959–1961 St. Brandon's School, Clevedon.

In 1923, Spencer Palmer received the Chappell Medal music award. She later won the Horatio Albert Lumb award for hymns and anthems. She was confirmed in the Church of England, and her compositions appeared in the Anglican Hymn Book. She arranged work by other composers, including Wings, a collection of songs by Amy Carmichael. Her works were published by Ascherberg Hopwood & Crew and Cramer & Co.

Published works 
Her publications included:

 Book
Simplified Sight Reading
 Chamber music
Three Pieces (cello and piano)
 Piano
A Pianist's Book of Chimes
Burlesque
Three Festive Pieces
Variations on Barbara Allen
 Vocal
"Brynland"
"Duplock"
"Ellasgarth"
"Except the Lord Build the House" (motet; text based on Psalm 127)
"Gate of the Year”(text by Minnie Louise Haskins)
"Like as a Father" (text based on Psalm 103)
"Nativity"
"O Love that Wilt Not Let Me Go" (text by George Matheson)

References

External links 
 Gate of the Year by Peggy Spencer Palmer

1900 births
1987 deaths
British women composers
Hymn tunes
Piano pedagogues
Alumni of the Royal Academy of Music
Alumni of the University of London